The Provo–Orem, UT Metropolitan Statistical Area, as defined by the United States Office of Management and Budget, is an area consisting of two counties in Utah, anchored by the cities of Provo and Orem. As of the 2020 census, the MSA had a population of 671,185.

Counties
Juab
Utah

Communities

 Alpine
 American Fork
 Benjamin (CDP)
 Birdseye (unincorporated)
 Bluffdale (partial)
 Callao (unincorporated)
 Cedar Fort
 Cedar Hills
 Draper (partial)
 Eagle Mountain
 Elberta (CDP)
 Elk Ridge
 Eureka
 Fairfield
 Genola
 Goshen
 Highland
 Juab (unincorporated)
 Lake Shore (CDP)
 Lehi
 Leland (unincorporated)
 Levan
 Lindon
 Mapleton
 Mills (unincorporated)
 Mona
 Nephi (county seat of Juab)
 Orem (Principal city)
 Palmyra (CDP)
 Partoun (unincorporated)
 Payson
 Pleasant Grove
 Provo (Principal city-Utah county seat)
 Rocky Ridge
 Salem
 Santaquin
 Saratoga Springs
 Spanish Fork
 Spring Lake (CDP)
 Springdell (unincorporated)
 Springville
 Trout Creek (unincorporated)
 Vineyard
 Vivian Park (unincorporated)
 West Mountain (CDP)
 Woodland Hills
 Former town site of Thistle

Demographics

As of the census of 2010, there were 526,810 people, 143,695 households, and 116,844 families residing within the MSA. The racial makeup of the MSA was 89.5% White, 0.5% African American, 0.6% Native American, 1.3% Asian, 0.7% Pacific Islander, 4.6% from other races, and 2.7% from two or more races. Hispanic or Latino of any race were 10.7% of the population.

As of the census of 2000, median income for a household in the MSA was $41,986, and the median income for a family was $46,426. Males had a median income of $35,750 versus $22,025 for females. The per capita income for the MSA was $14,174.

A survey of about 190 metropolitan areas found 77% of Provo-Orem residents are classified as "very religious," the largest percentage in the United States.

See also
Utah census statistical areas
Wasatch Front

References

 
Metropolitan areas of Utah